Thomas Kerry may refer to:

Thomas William Kerry (died 1967/68), British trade unionist
Thomas Kerry (MP) (by 1533-1607), MP for Leominster

See also
Thomas Carey (disambiguation)